Fercé is a commune in the Loire-Atlantique department in western France.

Geography
The Semnon forms part of the commune's northern border; the Brutz, a tributary of the Semnon, forms all of its southern border. Fercé is also located near to La Bretèche, the highest point in the Loire-Atlantique at 116 metres.

Population

Climate

See also
Communes of the Loire-Atlantique department

References 

Communes of Loire-Atlantique